Maverley Hughenden F.C. is a Jamaican football team based in Kingston.

History 
Maverley Hughenden F.C. were crowned champions of 2015/16 KSAFA Super League season. This qualified for the National Premier Playoff where they gained promotion to the Jamaica Premier League off 1 point.

In the 2016-17 season, Maverley were 1 point off staying in the National Premier League, as a result they were sent back down to the KSAFA Super League.

Honours 

 KSAFA Super League: 2015/16

References

Football clubs in Jamaica